The African Cup of Champions Clubs 1967 was the 3rd edition of the annual international club football competition held in the CAF region (Africa), the African Cup of Champions Clubs. It determined that year's club champion of association football in Africa.

The tournament was played by 18 teams and used a knock-out format with ties played home and away. TP Englebert from Congo-Kinshasa won the final, and became CAF club champion for the first time.

Preliminary round

|}
1 Augustinians FC withdrew.

First round

|}
1 Diamant Yaoundé, Invincible Eleven and Bitumastic withdrew. 
2 TP Englebert won after a drawing of lots.

Quarter-finals

|}
1 Al-Ittihad withdrew. 
2 Olympic (Alexandria) withdrew after the first leg.

Semi-finals

|}

Final

Aggregate 3–3, replay required.

1 At the expiration of extra time in the second leg, the referee decided that lots would be drawn to attribute the trophy on the next day, but the CAF secretary-general later arrived, with Cup regulations requiring that a third match be played. 

The decider was set for December 27, in Yaoundé, Cameroon, but Asante Kotoko failed to appear (apparently not having been informed of the match arrangements by the Ghanaian FA); as a result, TP Englebert were declared champions.

Champion

Top scorers
The top scorers from the 1967 African Cup of Champions Clubs are as follows:

External links
RSSSF summary of results at Rec.Sport.Soccer Statistics Foundation

1
African Cup of Champions Clubs